The End of the Beginning is the fourteenth studio album by the British singer-songwriter Judie Tzuke, released in 2004.

This album cover artwork was designed by artist Lia Sáile.

Track listing
 "The Written Word"
 "Jerry McGuire"
 "World Without You"
 "Imagining"
 "Like the Sun"
 "Fight"
 "Here and Now"
 "Before I Found Your Heart"
 "I Will"
 "The Damage Done"
 "Move Me"
 "I Will (Live)"

References
Official website

Judie Tzuke albums
2004 albums